Erika deLone (born October 14, 1972) is an American retired tennis player who turned professional in 1992. She reached one WTA Tour singles final in her career, finishing runner-up to Åsa Svensson at the Wismilak International in 1999. In April 2000, she reached her career-high singles ranking of world No. 65.

DeLone won one WTA Tour doubles title in her career, winning the 2000 Rosmalen Grass Court Championships in 's-Hertogenbosch, partnering Australian Nicole Pratt. She reached her career-high doubles ranking of world No. 45 in December 2000. In 2003, she retired from professional tennis. Her sister Amy was a professional tennis player as well.

WTA career finals

Singles: 1 (1 runner-up)

Doubles: 2 (1 title, 1 runner-up)

ITF Circuit finals

Singles: 12 (9–3)

Doubles: 17 (9–8)

Unplayed final

External links
 
 

1972 births
Living people
American female tennis players
Harvard Crimson women's tennis players
Sportspeople from Middlesex County, Massachusetts
People from Lincoln, Massachusetts
Tennis people from Massachusetts